Super Cruel (stylised in all caps) are an Australian electronic music duo. The pair are from Sydney and Adelaide.

Career
In March 2017, Super Cruel released their debut single “November" featuring Lisa Mitchell. which was followed by the release of "Sicklaced" Featuring Cxloe in November. The video clip for the song features Josh Heuston and Cartia Mallan. They produced an official remix for Major Lazer's 2017 single "Know No Better".

Touring
Super Cruel have performed at festivals such as Spilt Milk and Splendour in the Grass.
They toured around Australia with Slumberjack in early 2019.

Discography

Singles

Remixes
2017
 Major Lazer Feat. Travis Scott, Camila Cabello & Quavo "Know No Better"

2019
Charli XCX Feat. Troye Sivan "1999"

References 

Australian electronic musicians
Musical groups established in 2017
Australian house musicians
Australian DJs
Electronic dance music DJs
2017 establishments in Australia